Riedaster reicheli is an extinct species of starfish in the family Astropectinidae. Riedaster reicheli was first described by Kutscher and Röper in 1999 from a three-dimensional body fossil. Its type locality is Papierschiefer, which is in a shallow subtidal mudstone in the Papierschiefer Formation in the Ried district of Germany. It is the type species of the genus Riedaster and dates back to the Late Jurassic.

References

Astropectinidae
Jurassic echinoderms
Fossils of Germany
Fossil taxa described in 1999